City Arts & Lectures produces onstage conversation at the Herbst Theatre in San Francisco.  Founded by Sydney Goldstein in 1980, City Arts & Lectures produces more than fifty live events a year and records most events for edited and delayed broadcast on public radio.  These programs are heard on over 170 public radio stations across the United States. Co-produced by National Public Radio affiliate KQED in San Francisco, the on-air broadcasts are introduced by Linda Hunt and hosted by various appropriate interviewers and luminaries.

The Herbst Theatre's earthquake retrofit which began in 2013, served as the impetus to restore the 1,687-seat Nourse Theater located a few blocks away at 275 Hayes Street, San Francisco, California. The Nourse Theater originally was presumed be the interim home of the lecture series. The Nourse Theater is now the main venue for City Arts and Lectures events.

References

External links
 Official website
 

NPR programs